Wilhelmus "Winy" Maas (born 1959 in Schijndel) is a Dutch architect, landscape architect, professor and urbanist. In 1993 together with Jacob van Rijs and Nathalie de Vries he set up MVRDV.

Education
He completed his studies at the RHSTL Boskoop, graduating as a "landscape architect", and in 1990 he got his degree from the Delft University of Technology. He currently is visiting professor of architectural design at the Massachusetts Institute of Technology and is professor in architecture and urban design at the faculty of architecture, Delft University of Technology. Before this he was professor at among others Berlage Institute, Ohio State and Yale University.

MVRDV
In 1993, together with Jacob van Rijs and Nathalie de Vries, he founded the MVRDV studio (an acronym of the initials of the names of the three founders), which produces designs and studies in the fields of architecture, urban studies and landscape design. The studies on light urbanism for the City of Rotterdam, the headquarters of the Dutch Public Broadcasting Company VPRO and the Wozoco's senior citizens' residences in Amsterdam, which won the J.A. van Eck Prize of the Dutch Architects' Association, have brought MVRDV to the attention of a vast collection of clients, giving the studio international renown. Today, the studio is actively involved in numerous projects in various parts of the world. MVRDV designed the Dutch pavilion for Expo 2000 in Hanover, the Logrono Eco-City in Spain, the Gyre building in Tokyo and many others.

Other positions
Winy Maas presented a keynote address New solutions for new challenges at the inaugural Holcim Forum, “Basic Needs” at the ETH Zurich in 2004.
In addition he designs stage sets, objects and was curator of Indesem 2007. He is member of the research board of Berlage Institute Rotterdam, president of the spatial quality board of Rotterdam and supervisor of the Bjorvika urban development in Oslo. He is professor at the Why Factory, a research institute for the future city he founded in 2008 which is part of the Faculty of Architecture of the Delft University of Technology.

Publications 
FARMAX (Ed., 010 Publishers, Rotterdam, 1999) 
Metacity/Datatown (Ed., 010 Publishers, Rotterdam, 1999) 
Reading MVRDV (NAi Publishers, Rotterdam, 2003) 
Spacefighter The evolutionary city game (Ed., Actar, Barcelona, 2005) 
KM3 Excursions on Capacities (Actar, Barcelona, 2006) 
Skycar City (Actar, Barcelona, 2008)

References

Further reading 
Gonzalo Herrero Delicado. Mirador Building, Madrid, Spain: MVRDV and Blanca Lleó 2005. - Galinsky, 2006
Orlandoni, Alessandra "Interview with Winy Maas" - The Plan 013, March 2006

External links 

 
photo gallery: mvrdv projects
Mirador building, Madrid

Dutch landscape architects
Dutch urban planners
1958 births
Living people
Dutch company founders
Delft University of Technology alumni
Academic staff of the Delft University of Technology
People from Schijndel
20th-century Dutch architects
21st-century Dutch architects
Domus (magazine) editors